George Whittaker may refer to:

 George Whittaker (Papua New Guinean politician) (1904–1964), member of the Legislative Council of Papua and New Guinea
 George Whittaker (Canadian politician) (1919–2013), member of the House of Commons of Canada
 George Whittaker (rowing) (born 1981), British rower
 George Byrom Whittaker (1793–1847), English bookseller and publisher

See also
 George Whitaker (disambiguation)